Naïm-Nhour Jan Van Attenhoven (born 31 January 2003) is a professional footballer who plays as a goalkeeper for French  club Valenciennes and the Niger national team. Born in Belgium, he represented them at youth level before switching his allegiance to Niger.

Club career
Van Attenhoven is a former youth team player of several Belgian clubs and Dutch club PSV. In May 2020, he joined the youth academy of Anderlecht. In January 2022, his contract with the club was terminated as per mutual agreement.

After spending six months as a free agent, Van Attenhoven joined newly promoted Belgian National Division 1 club Ninove in July 2022.

International career
Van Attenhoven is eligible to represent both Belgium and Niger at international level. He is a former Belgian youth international and has played in friendlies for under-17 team.

In March 2021, Van Attenhoven received maiden call-up to Niger national team for Africa Cup of Nations qualification matches against Ivory Coast and Madagascar. He made his senior team debut on 9 June 2021 in a 1–0 friendly defeat against Congo. He also played for Niger under-20 team at 2021 Arab Cup U-20 the same month.

Personal life
Van Attenhoven was born in Belgium to a Belgian father and a Nigerien mother. He is the nephew of former Nigerien international footballer Ibrahim Tankary.

Career statistics

International

References

External links
 
 Naïm-Nhour Van Attenhoven at ACFF
 

2003 births
Living people
Footballers from Brussels
People with acquired Nigerien citizenship
Nigerien footballers
Niger youth international footballers
Niger international footballers
Belgian footballers
Belgium youth international footballers
Nigerien people of Belgian descent
Belgian people of Nigerien descent
Association football goalkeepers
Black Belgian sportspeople